The green whip snake or western whip snake (Hierophis viridiflavus) is a species of snake in the family Colubridae.

Geographic range
This species is present in Andorra, Croatia, France, Greece, Italy, Malta, Slovenia, Spain, Switzerland, and possibly Luxembourg.

Habitat
Its natural habitats are temperate forests, temperate shrubland, Mediterranean-type shrubby vegetation, arable land, pastureland, plantations, rural gardens, and urban areas.

Description

The green whip snake is a slender species with a small but well-defined head, prominent eyes with circular pupils, and smooth scales. The background colour is greenish-yellow but this is mostly obscured by heavy, somewhat irregular bands of dark green or black, particularly in the front half of the snake. The underparts are grey or yellowish and the tail has narrow longitudinal stripes. The young are a greyish colour and develop their full adult colouring by about their fourth year. In the northeastern part of its range, in Sicily and southern Italy, most individuals are blackish in colour.

Status
The green whip snake has a wide distribution and is very common within that range. The population is steady and faces no significant threats, apart from road kill and persecution, and the International Union for Conservation of Nature has assessed its conservation status as being of "least concern".

Biology
These snakes mainly feed on lizards, skinks,  frogs, mice, as well as on the young and eggs of small birds. This species lays four to 15 eggs. They are very lively and when cornered, may bite furiously. They hibernate in winter.

Venom and toxicity
Commonly regarded as non-venomous, it is described that a subject who endured 'sustained biting' of up to 5 minutes began showing suspect symptoms, including problems with neuromotor skills. It is described that a gland called the Duvernoy's gland, maybe similar to the venom gland, has some responsibility.

References

See also 
 List of reptiles of Italy

Hierophis
Reptiles described in 1789
Taxonomy articles created by Polbot
Reptiles of Europe